A lunar lander or Moon lander is a spacecraft designed to land on the surface of the Moon. As of 2021, the Apollo Lunar Module is the only lunar lander to have ever been used in human spaceflight, completing six lunar landings from 1969 to 1972 during the United States' Apollo Program.

The design requirements for these landers depend on factors imposed by the payload, flight rate, propulsive requirements, and configuration constraints. Other important design factors include overall energy requirements, mission duration, the type of mission operations on the lunar surface, and life support system if crewed. The relatively high gravity and lack of lunar atmosphere negates the use of aerobraking, so a lander must use propulsion to decelerate and achieve a soft landing.

Several studies indicate the potential for both scientific and technological benefits from sustained lunar surface exploration that would culminate in the utilization of lunar resources, or in the development of the necessary technology to land payloads on other planets in the Solar System.

History
The Luna program was a series of robotic impactors, flybys, orbiters, and landers flown by the Soviet Union between 1958 and 1976. Luna 9 was the first spacecraft to achieve a soft landing on the Moon on February 3, 1966, after 11 unsuccessful attempts. Three Luna Spacecraft returned lunar soil samples to Earth from 1972 to 1976. Two other Luna spacecraft soft-landed the Lunokhod robotic lunar rover in 1970 and 1973. Luna achieved a total of seven successful soft landings, out of 27 attempts.

The United States' Surveyor program first soft-landed Surveyor 1 on June 2, 1966, and successfully soft-landed four more, in a total of seven attempts through January 10, 1968.

The Apollo Lunar Module was the lunar lander for the United States' Apollo program. As of 2022, it is the only lunar lander to have ever been used in human spaceflight, completing six lunar landings from 1969 to 1972.

The LK lunar module was the lunar lander developed by the Soviet Union as a part of several Soviet crewed lunar programs. Several LK lunar modules were flown without crew in low Earth orbit, but the LK lunar module never flew to the Moon, as the development of the N1 Rocket Launch Vehicle required for the lunar flight suffered setbacks (including several launch failures), and after the first human Moon landings were achieved by the United States, the Soviet Union cancelled both the N1 Rocket and the LK Lunar Module programs without any further development.

Proposed landers
 Altair (spacecraft), a proposed spacecraft for the Constellation program previously known as the Lunar Surface Access Module
 Lunar Lander (space mission), an ESA mission to send an autonomous lander to the Moon
 Lunar Lander Challenge, a competition to produce VTVL vehicles with sufficient delta-v to fly from the Moon to orbit
 Luna-Glob, a lunar exploration program by the Russian Federal Space Agency
 Lockheed Martin Lunar Lander, proposed lunar lander for Moon Missions under Project Artemis.
 Mighty Eagle lander (previously called NASA Robotic Lunar Lander) current NASA program for developing a new generation of small, autonomous lunar landers
 Project Morpheus, a NASA research and development program test bed
 XEUS A human rated lunar lander being developed by United Launch Alliance and Masten Space Systems
 Boeing Lunar Lander is a proposal for a human landing system for NASA's Artemis program
 Blue Origin, Lockheed Martin, Northrop Grumman and Draper Laboratory proposed a human landing system for NASA's Artemis program

Human landers under development 
On April 16, 2021, NASA announced a US$2.89 billion firm-fixed price contract with SpaceX for an uncrewed and subsequent crewed mission to the Moon using Starship HLS.

Challenges unique to lunar landing
Landing on any Solar System body comes with challenges unique to that body.  The Moon has relatively high gravity compared to that of asteroids or comets—and some other planetary satellites—and no significant atmosphere.  Practically, this means that the only method of descent and landing that can provide sufficient thrust with current technology is based on chemical rockets.  In addition, the Moon has a long solar day.  Landers will be in direct sunlight for more than two weeks at a time, and then in complete darkness for another two weeks.  This causes significant problems for thermal control.

Lack of atmosphere
 space probes have landed on all three bodies other than Earth that have solid surfaces and atmospheres thick enough to make aerobraking possible: Mars, Venus, and Saturn's moon Titan.  These probes were able to leverage the atmospheres of the bodies on which they landed to slow their descent using parachutes, reducing the amount of fuel they were required to carry.  This in turn allowed larger payloads to be landed on these bodies for a given amount of fuel.  For example, the 900-kg Curiosity rover was landed on Mars by a craft having a mass (at the time of Mars atmospheric entry) of 2400 kg, of which only 390 kg was fuel.  In comparison, the much lighter (292 kg) Surveyor 3 landed on the Moon in 1967 using nearly 700 kg of fuel.  The lack of an atmosphere, however, removes the need for a Moon lander to have a heat shield and also allows aerodynamics to be disregarded when designing the craft.

High gravity
Although it has much less gravity than Earth, the Moon has sufficiently high gravity that descent must be slowed considerably.  This is in contrast to an asteroid, in which "landing" is more often called "docking" and is a matter of rendezvous and matching velocity more than slowing a rapid descent.

Since rocketry is used for descent and landing, the Moon's gravity necessitates the use of more fuel than is needed for asteroid landing.  Indeed, one of the central design constraints for the Apollo program's Moon landing was mass (as more mass requires more fuel to land) required to land and take off from the Moon.

Thermal environment
The lunar thermal environment is influenced by the length of the lunar day. These extremes occur for fourteen Earth days each, so thermal control systems must be designed to handle long periods of extreme cold or heat. This means that the lander must cool and heat its instruments or crew compartment.

The length of the lunar night makes it difficult to use solar electric power to heat the instruments, and nuclear heaters are often used.

Landing stages
Achieving a soft landing is the overarching goal of any lunar lander, and distinguishes landers from impactors, which were the first type of spacecraft to reach the surface of the Moon.

All lunar landers require rocket engines for descent.  Orbital speed around the Moon can, depending on altitude, exceed 1500 m/s.  Spacecraft on impact trajectories can have speeds well in excess of that.  In the vacuum the only way to slow down from that speed is to use a rocket engine.

The stages of landing can include:

 Descent orbit insertion – the spacecraft enters an orbit favorable for final descent.  This stage was not present in the early landing efforts, which did not begin with lunar orbit.  Such missions began on a lunar impact trajectory instead.
 Descent and braking – the spacecraft fires its engines until it is no longer in orbit.  If the engines were to stop firing entirely at this stage the spacecraft would eventually impact the surface.  During this stage, the spacecraft uses its rocket engine to reduce overall speed
 Final approach – The spacecraft is nearly at the landing site, and final adjustments for the exact location of touchdown can be made
 Touchdown – the spacecraft achieves soft landing on the Moon

Touchdown
Lunar landings typically end with the engine shutting down when the lander is several feet above the lunar surface. The idea is that engine exhaust and lunar regolith can cause problems if they were to be kicked back from the surface to the spacecraft, and thus the engines cut off just before touchdown. Engineers must ensure that the vehicle is protected enough to ensure that the fall without thrust does not cause damage.

The first soft lunar landing, performed by the Soviet Luna 9 probe, was achieved by first slowing the spacecraft to a suitable speed and altitude, then ejecting a payload containing the scientific experiments. The payload was stopped on the lunar surface using airbags, which provided cushioning as it fell. Luna 13 used a similar method.

Airbag methods are not typical. For example, NASA's Surveyor 1 probe, launched around the same time as Luna 9, did not use an airbag for final touchdown. Instead, after it arrested its velocity at an altitude of 3.4m it simply fell to the lunar surface. To accommodate the fall the spacecraft was equipped with crushable components that would soften the blow and keep the payload safe. More recently, the Chinese Chang'e 3 lander used a similar technique, falling 4m after its engine shut down. 

Perhaps the most famous lunar landers, those of the Apollo Program, were robust enough to handle the drop once their contact probes detected that landing was imminent. During Apollo 11 Neil Armstrong however touched down very gently by firing the engine until touchdown; some later crews shut down the engine before touchdown and felt noticeable bumps on landing, with greater compression of the landing struts.

See also
 List of artificial objects on the Moon, a list of objects that have been left, landed, or crashed on the Moon
 List of crewed lunar lander designs

References

Exploration of the Moon
Moon